Ismael Ruiz Salmón (born 7 July 1977 in Santander, Cantabria), known simply as Ismael, is a Spanish retired footballer who played as a central midfielder.

Honours

International
Spain U18
UEFA European Under-18 Championship: 1995

Spain U23
Summer Olympic silver medal: 2000

External links
 
 

1977 births
Living people
Spanish footballers
Footballers from Santander, Spain
Association football midfielders
La Liga players
Segunda División players
Segunda División B players
Tercera División players
Rayo Cantabria players
Racing de Santander players
Terrassa FC footballers
Real Oviedo players
Benidorm CF footballers
Spain youth international footballers
Spain under-21 international footballers
Spain under-23 international footballers
Olympic footballers of Spain
Footballers at the 2000 Summer Olympics
Olympic medalists in football
Medalists at the 2000 Summer Olympics
Olympic silver medalists for Spain